Nico Blok (born 13 July 1981) is a retired Dutch para table tennis player who competed in international level events. He is a Paralympic bronze medalist, three-time World medalist and a double European silver medalist.

Personal life
When Blok was born in a hospital in Gouda, South Holland, doctors suspected that there was something wrong with him after he was born, it was later revealed that he was born with an unknown muscular disease. Due to this unknown muscular disease, he was prominently thin as he only weighed 40kg at a height of 1.77m and has also had limited muscle strength and walking long distances were impossible for him.

Blok was very fascinated in sports at a young age: his older brother played soccer and tennis but it was too hard for Nico. His parents tried to find an alternative sport for him to participate in and when he was nine years old, he tried out table tennis and this was how he got his motivation.

References

1981 births
Living people
Sportspeople from Gouda, South Holland
Sportspeople from Utrecht (city)
Paralympic table tennis players of the Netherlands
Table tennis players at the 2000 Summer Paralympics
Table tennis players at the 2004 Summer Paralympics
Table tennis players at the 2008 Summer Paralympics
Medalists at the 2008 Summer Paralympics
Dutch male table tennis players